The 1947 Rutgers Queensmen football team represented Rutgers University in the 1947 college football season. In their sixth season under head coach Harvey Harman, the Queensmen compiled an 8–1 record and outscored their opponents 262 to 99. The team lost its opening game against Columbia before winning eight consecutive games, including a 31–7 victory over Harvard.

Frank R. Burns starred for the team.

Schedule

References

Rutgers
Rutgers Scarlet Knights football seasons
Rutgers Queensmen football